Peter Osterhoff (born 25 August 1937) is a German former professional footballer who played as a forward for FC St. Pauli. He is the club's most successful goal scorer and was voted part of the club's team of the century by FC St. Pauli's fans.

References

External links
 

1937 births
Living people
Footballers from Hamburg
German footballers
Association football forwards
FC St. Pauli players